This is a list of notable chemical engineers, people who studied or practiced chemical engineering.  The main list is those who achieved status in chemical engineering or a closely related field such as management or science.  At the foot of the page is a list of people with chemical engineering qualifications who are notable for other reasons, such as actors, sportspeople and authors.  These are people sufficiently notable to have an article in Wikipedia.  Further articles on chemical engineers would be welcome.  See the talk page for suggestions of people who should be added to the encyclopedia (and then to this list).



Chemical engineers who became notable for other activities
 Najma Akhtar, English actress and singer; earned a master's in chemical engineering from Aston University
 Ramani Ayer, CEO of The Hartford, earned a master's and PhD in chemical engineering from Drexel University
 Rajeev Bajaj, self-published the educational geek rap album Geek Rhythms in 2004
 Jacques Bergier, French writer, graduated in chemical engineering from Chimie ParisTech and worked on early nuclear engineering
 Garry Betty, contributor to the design of the original personal computer; earned a chemical engineering degree at Georgia Tech
 Harsha Bhogle, Indian international cricket commentator, chemical engineering degree from Osmania University
 Jerzy Buzek, former Prime Minister of Poland and President of the European Parliament
 Frank Capra, movie director, earned a chemical engineering degree at California Institute of Technology
 Ray Davis, U.S. General and recipient of the U.S. Medal of Honor, graduated with a degree in chemical engineering from Georgia School of Technology
 Thierry Dusautoir, captain of the French National Rugby Union team, studied chemical engineering at the École Nationale Supérieure in Bordeaux
 Vilma Espin, Cuban revolutionary and former wife of Raul Castro, studied chemical engineering at the Massachusetts Institute of Technology
 Gallagher, standup comedian, earned a chemical engineering degree at the University of South Florida
 Kevin Greening, science presenter on Radio Five Live (UK), studied chemical engineering at St Catharine's College, Cambridge
 Hu Tsu Tau Richard, former Minister for Finance (Singapore) (1985–2001)
 Pat Kenney, broadcaster, earned a chemical engineering degree from University College Dublin
 Bill Koch, businessman and skipper of 1992 America's Cup winning yacht
 Ashok Kumar, Indian-born British Labour politician, BSc, MSc, PhD in chemical engineering at Aston University
 Dolph Lundgren, actor and karateka, earned an undergraduate chemical engineering degree from the Royal Institute of Technology and a master's degree in chemical engineering from the University of Sydney
 Khalid Masud, Muslim scholar from Pakistan, obtained a master's degree in chemistry from the University of the Punjab and a chemical engineering diploma from King's College, Cambridge
 John von Neumann, mathematician and physicist, studied chemical engineering at ETH-Zurich
 Nitin Nohria, Dean of Harvard Business School, gained BTech in chemical engineering from the Indian Institute of Technology Bombay
 Seyi Olofinjana, Nigerian international footballer, earned degree in chemical engineering from Ladoke Akintola University of Technology
 Michael Ruffin, American professional basketball player, earned degree in chemical engineering from University of Tulsa
 Tuanku Zara Salim, Queen of Perak, degree in chemical engineering from the University of Nottingham and worked for Petrona
 E. E. Smith, science fiction author of the Lensman and Skylark series fame; earned a PhD in chemical engineering from George Washington University
 Srinivas, Indian playback singer, earned degree in chemical engineering from University of Mumbai
 Xi Jinping, current CPC General Secretary and President of China, studied chemical engineering at Tsinghua University
 Benjamin Lee Whorf, American linguist, earned a degree in chemical engineering from Massachusetts Institute of Technology
 Nadhim Zahawi UK politician and minister, has a BSc in chemical engineering from University College London

Chemical engineers in fiction
 In the Charlie Chan film The Shanghai Cobra (1945), "H.R. Jarvis, Chemical Engineer" is stenciled on the laboratory door rented by the eponymous villain who had been using that alias while he schemed to steal radium from a nearby bank vault.
 In the CBS radio thriller The House in Cypress Canyon, which aired live on 5 December 1945, on "Suspense Radio," the character "James A. Woods, Chemical Engineer" was the perpetrator of a murder-suicide and was the narrator/protagonist of the supernatural yarn found in a shoebox, the basis of the story.
In a 1958 episode of Alfred Hitchcock Presents, "The Motive", character Tom Greer kills a man he finds in the phone book, who happens to be a chemical engineer.
 Captain Virgil "The Cooler King" Hilts, as portrayed by Steve McQueen in the 1963 film The Great Escape
 Graeme Miller, played by Ewen Bremner in the 2004 film AVP: Alien vs. Predator
 Stanley Goodspeed, played by Nicolas Cage in The Rock
 Gunner Jensen, played by Dolph Lundgren in the 2012 film The Expendables 2
 Comic Book Guy in The Simpsons has a degree in chemical engineering.

See also
 Lists of notable engineers by discipline for lists of engineers by discipline.

References

Chemical engineers